John Goldsmith (1 April 1766 – 15 March 1845) was an English first-class cricketer who played for Surrey in one first-class match in 1792, totalling 11 runs with a highest score of 8.

Although he played for Surrey, Goldsmith was a native of Hambledon, Hampshire, where he was born and died. His uncle was the Hambledon Club player Peter Stewart.

References

Bibliography
 

English cricketers
English cricketers of 1787 to 1825
Surrey cricketers
1766 births
1845 deaths